William Arthur (5 December 1796 – ) was an Irish-born American Baptist minister and abolitionist.  He was the father of the twenty-first president of the United States, Chester A. Arthur.

Life
William Arthur was born on 5 December 1796 in Ballymena Borough, County Antrim.  His parents names were Alan Arthur and Eliza MacHerg. Alan Arthur was the namesake for his grandson's middle name. 

William Arthur graduated from Belfast College, came to the United States, studied law for a short time, and was then called to the Baptist ministry. After preaching in Vermont and western New York, he was settled as pastor of the Calvary Baptist church of Albany, N. Y., where he remained from 1855 to 1863. He afterward removed to Schenectady, where he published a magazine called The Antiquarian and General Review, to whose pages he contributed much curious learning on a variety of topics. He published an Etymological Dictionary of Family and Christian Names (New York, 1857), which was favorably received.  

During the last ten years of his life he lived in retirement, preaching occasionally, and giving much time to literary pursuits.  Arthur was noted for his attainments in the classics and in history.  William Arthur died on 27 October 1875 in Newtonville.

His son, Chester A. Arthur would serve as President of the United States.

References

Created via preloaddraft
1796 births
1875 deaths
18th-century Irish people
19th-century Irish writers
19th-century Baptist ministers
19th-century lexicographers
People from Ballymena
Baptist ministers from Northern Ireland
Arthur family
Irish emigrants to the United States (before 1923)
Irish lexicographers